Distorsionella pseudaphera is a species of medium-sized sea snail, a marine gastropod mollusk in the family Thalassocyonidae.

Description

Distribution

References

Thalassocyonidae
Gastropods described in 1998